Adre may refer to:
 Adré, a town in Chad
 Adre (TV series), a Welsh language television series broadcast on S4C
 Battle of Adré, a 2005 battle during the Second Chadian Civil War